Jacob S. Boreman (August 4, 1831 – October 7, 1913) was a justice of the Supreme Court of the Utah Territory from 1873 to 1880, and again from 1885 to 1889.

Born in Tyler County, Virginia (now in West Virginia), Boreman graduated from the law department of the University of Virginia in 1855. Shortly thereafter he moved to Kansas City, where in 1861 he was elected City Attorney. From 1862 to 1868 he was judge of the Common Pleas Court of Jackson County, Missouri, and was twice elected to the Missouri State Legislature. During the American Civil War, he raised a company of militia for the Union. In 1873, President Ulysses S. Grant appointed Boreman associate justice of the territorial Utah Supreme Court, to which Boreman was reappointed by President Rutherford B. Hayes in 1877.

Boreman resigned from the Supreme Court Bench in 1880 to enter the practice of law in Salt Lake City, in which practice he continued until 1885, when he was again appointed to the Supreme Court of Utah. When in 1889 his term expired, he moved to Ogden where he engaged in the practice of law until 1897.

Boreman retired from public life in 1897, having "taken a very active part, political and legal, in three states", and living in retirement until his death, at his home on Jefferson Avenue in Ogden, Utah.

References

Justices of the Utah Supreme Court
1831 births
1913 deaths
People from Tyler County, West Virginia
University of Virginia alumni
United States Article I federal judges appointed by Ulysses S. Grant
United States Article I federal judges appointed by Rutherford B. Hayes
Boreman family